The 2019 Tampere Open was a professional tennis tournament played on clay courts for men and indoor hard courts for women. It was the 38th edition of the tournament which was part of the 2019 ATP Challenger Tour and the 2019 ITF Women's World Tennis Tour. It took place in Tampere, Finland, on 22–28 July 2019.

Men's singles main draw entrants

Seeds 

 1 Rankings as of 15 July 2019.

Other entrants 
The following players received wildcards into the singles main draw:
  Harri Heliövaara
  Patrik Niklas-Salminen
  Roni Rikkonen
  Eero Vasa
  Panu Virtanen

The following player received entry into the singles main draw as a special exempt:
  Kimmer Coppejans

The following players received entry into the singles main draw using their ITF World Tennis Ranking:
  Christopher Heyman
  Ivan Nedelko
  Christopher O'Connell
  Botic van de Zandschulp
  Jeroen Vanneste

The following players received entry from the qualifying draw:
  Fabien Reboul
  Alexander Zhurbin

Women's singles main draw entrants

Seeds 

 1 Rankings as of 15 July 2019.
 (ITF): ITF World Tennis Ranking.

Other entrants 
The following players received wildcards into the singles main draw:
  Emma Eerola
  Emilia Hartman
  Lotta Heiskanen
  Katriin Saar

The following players received entry from the qualifying draw:
  Sofiya Chekhlystova
  Elena Jamshidi
  Maria Lota Kaul
  Evgeniya Levashova
  Sofiia Likhacheva
  Vilena Petrova

The following player received entry as a lucky loser:
  Maria Fernanda Morales

Champions

Men's singles 

 Mikael Ymer def.  Tallon Griekspoor 6–3, 5–7, 6–3.

Women's singles 
  Anastasia Kulikova def.  Victoria Kalaitzis, 6–4, 6–7(2–7), 6–3

Men's doubles 

  Sander Arends /  David Pel def.  Ivan Nedelko /  Alexander Zhurbin 6–0, 6–2.

Women's doubles 
  Polina Bakhmutkina /  Noel Saidenova def.  Isabella Bozicevic /  Anastasia Kulikova, 6–2, 6–3

References

External links 
 Official website

2019
Tampere Open
Tampere Open
Tampere Open
July 2019 sports events in Europe